Is This Whatcha Wont? is the self-produced sixth album by American R&B singer Barry White, released in November 1976 on the 20th Century label.

History
The album reached #25 on the R&B albums chart, White's first to miss the top ten, and peaked at #125 on the Billboard 200. The album yielded two singles, "Don't Make Me Wait Too Long" and "I'm Qualified to Satisfy You" which peaked at #20 and #25 on the Billboard R&B Singles chart respectively. This was his first album that failed to produce a top ten single on that chart. Both singles also charted on the UK Singles Chart, at #17 and #37 respectively. The album was digitally remastered and reissued on CD on March 19, 1996 by Mercury Records.

Track listing

Personnel
Barry White - lead vocals, arranger
Gene Page - arranger
Technical
Barney Perkins, Frank Kejmar - engineer

Charts

Singles

References

External links
 Is This Whatcha Wont? at Discogs

Barry White albums
1976 albums
albums arranged by Gene Page
20th Century Fox Records albums